Hemilepistus rhinoceros is a species of crustacean first discovered by Borutzkii in 1958. No subspecies are listed at Catalogue of Life.

References

Crustaceans described in 1958
Trachelipodidae